The 1996–97 daytime network television schedule for the six major English-language commercial broadcast networks in the United States covers the weekday and weekend daytime hours from September 1996 to August 1997. The schedule is followed by a list per network of returning series, new series, and series canceled after the 1995–96 season.

Affiliates fill time periods not occupied by network programs with local or syndicated programming. PBS – which offers daytime programming through a children's program block, branded as PTV at the time – is not included, as its member television stations have local flexibility over most of their schedules and broadcast times for network shows may vary.

Legend

 New series are highlighted in bold.

Schedule
 All times correspond to U.S. Eastern and Pacific Time scheduling (except for some live sports or events). Except where affiliates slot certain programs outside their network-dictated timeslots, subtract one hour for Central, Mountain, Alaska, and Hawaii-Aleutian times.
 Local schedules may differ, as affiliates have the option to pre-empt or delay network programs. Such scheduling may be limited to preemptions caused by local or national breaking news or weather coverage (which may force stations to tape delay certain programs in overnight timeslots or defer them to a co-operated or contracted station in their regular timeslot) and any major sports events scheduled to air in a weekday timeslot (mainly during major holidays). Stations may air shows at other times at their preference.

Monday–Friday

 
Notes:
 ABC, NBC and CBS offered their early morning newscasts via a looping feed (usually running as late as 10:00 a.m. Pacific Time) to accommodate local scheduling in the westernmost contiguous time zones or for use a filler programming for stations that do not offer a local morning newscast; some stations without a morning newscast may air syndicated or time-lease programs instead of the full newscast loop.
 NBC allowed owned-and-operated and affiliated stations the preference of airing Another World and Days of Our Lives in reverse order from the network's recommended scheduling.
 Sunset Beach debuted on NBC on January 6, 1997, and was made available to affiliates at either noon/11:00 CT or 3:00/2:00 CT. Some NBC affiliates did not air Sunset Beach in the noon timeslot, opting to air local news and/or syndicated programming instead, and often placing the soap opera in a late morning or afternoon time slot.
 The City aired its last episode on ABC on March 28; abbreviated half-hour versions of classic episodes of All My Children, One Life to Live and General Hospital filled the timeslot in the interim, until Port Charles premiered in its place on June 1, 1997; The City and Port Charles was fed to affiliates at Noon/11:00 a.m. CT or 12:30 p.m./11:30 a.m. CT, depending on local scheduling preference.
 (+) Fox Kids temporarily aired Mighty Morphin Power Rangers reruns in the 4:30 p.m. ET slot for two non-consecutive weeks during the 1996–97 midseason (one in February and one in March).
 Fox Kids ran temporary stunt blocks of animated and live-action series in the 3:30 p.m. ET time slot during the Spring of 1997, including:
 Bobby's World (March 31–April 11)
 Spider-Man (April 14–25)
 Goosebumps (April 28–May 2)
 Eerie, Indiana (May 5–9)
 Life with Louie (May 12–16)
 Casper (May 19–23)
 In July, Fox Kids replaced Power Rangers reruns at 4:30 p.m. ET with Round the Twist (Monday–Thursday) and Stickin' Around (Friday).

Saturday

CBS note: The Twisted Tales of Felix the Cat and Beakman's World switched timeslots on July 12.

Sunday

By network

ABC

Returning series:
ABC Weekend Special
ABC World News This Morning
ABC World News Tonight with Peter Jennings
All My Children
The Bugs Bunny and Tweety Show
Caryl & Marilyn: Real Friends
The City
General Hospital
Good Morning America
The New Adventures of Winnie the Pooh 
One Life to Live
Schoolhouse Rock! 
This Week

New series:
Bone Chillers
Brand Spanking New! Doug
DuckTales
Flash Forward
Gargoyles: The Goliath Chronicles
Jungle Cubs
The Mighty Ducks
Nightmare Ned
Port Charles
Street Sharks
The View

Not returning from 1995-96:
Bump in the Night
Dumb and Dumber
Free Willy 
Fudge
Hypernauts
Loving
Mike and Maty
The New Adventures of Madeline
ReBoot
What-a-Mess

CBS

Returning series:
Ace Ventura: Pet Detective
As the World Turns
Beakman's World
The Bold and the Beautiful
CBS Evening News
CBS Morning News
CBS News Sunday Morning
CBS Storybreak 
Face the Nation
Guiding Light
The Mask: Animated Series
The Price Is Right
Teenage Mutant Ninja Turtles
The Lion King's Timon & Pumbaa
The Twisted Tales of Felix the Cat
The Young and the Restless

New series:
Bailey Kipper's P.O.V.
Project Geeker
Secrets of the Cryptkeeper's Haunted House

Not returning from 1995-96:
The Adventures of Hyperman
Aladdin
Garfield and Friends
Really Wild Animals
Santo Bugito

Fox

Returning series:
The Adventures of Batman & Robin
Bobby's World
Eek! Stravaganza
Fox News Sunday
Goosebumps
Life With Louie
Mighty Morphin Power Rangers 
Fox's Peter Pan & the Pirates 
Power Rangers Zeo
Spider-Man
The Spooktacular New Adventures of Casper
The Tick
Where on Earth Is Carmen Sandiego?
X-Men

New series:
Big Bad Beetleborgs
C Bear and Jamal
Eerie, Indiana 
Fox After Breakfast
Power Rangers Turbo
Round the Twist
Stickin' Around

Not returning from 1995-96:
Attack of the Killer Tomatoes 
The Fox Cubhouse
Masked Rider
Taz-Mania

NBC

Returning series:
Another World
California Dreams
Days of Our Lives
Hang Time
Leeza
Meet the Press
NBA Inside Stuff
NBC News at Sunrise
NBC Nightly News
Real Life with Jane Pauley
Saved by the Bell: The New Class
Today

New series:
Sunset Beach

UPN

New series:
Bureau of Alien Detectors
The Incredible Hulk
Jumanji
The Mouse and the Monster

Not returning from 1995-96:
Space Strikers
Teknoman

The WB

Returning series:
Animaniacs
Bugs 'n' Daffy
Earthworm Jim
Freakazoid!
Pinky and the Brain
The Sylvester & Tweety Mysteries

New series:
The Daffy Duck Show
Road Rovers
Superman: The Animated Series
Waynehead

See also
1996-97 United States network television schedule (prime-time)
1996-97 United States network television schedule (late night)

References

Sources
https://web.archive.org/web/20071015122215/http://curtalliaume.com/abc_day.html
https://web.archive.org/web/20071015122235/http://curtalliaume.com/cbs_day.html
https://web.archive.org/web/20071012211242/http://curtalliaume.com/nbc_day.html
https://kidsblockblog.wordpress.com/2012/10/25/fox-kids-weekday-lineups-1995-1997/
https://www.cs.cmu.edu/~aarong/from-andrew/wb/kidswb-schedule.html

United States weekday network television schedules
1996 in American television
1997 in American television